The following is a list of events affecting American television in 2016. Events listed include television show debuts, finales, and cancellations; channel launches, closures, and rebrandings; stations changing or adding their network affiliations; and information about controversies and carriage disputes.

Notable events

January

February

March

April

May

June

July

August

September

October

November

December

Unknown (dates)

Television programs

Programs debuting in 2016

These shows are scheduled to premiere in 2016. The premiere dates may be changed depending on a variety of factors.

Miniseries

Television films and specials

Programs changing networks

Programs returning in 2016

The following shows will return with new episodes after being canceled or ended their run previously:

Milestone episodes

Programs ending in 2016

Entering syndication in 2016
A list of programs (current or canceled) that have accumulated enough episodes (between 65 and 100) or seasons (3 or more) to be eligible for off-network syndication and/or basic cable runs.

Television stations

Station launches

Stations changing network affiliation

Deaths

References

External links
List of 2016 American television series at IMDb

 
2016